Juan A. Rodríguez Iglesias (9 July 1928 – 27 September 2019) was a rower from Uruguay, who represented his native country twice at the Summer Olympics (1948 and 1952). In both tournaments he won the bronze medal in the men's doubles sculls event. He was born in Dolores, Uruguay.

References
databaseOlympics
Juan Rodríguez's obituary 

1928 births
2019 deaths
Uruguayan male rowers
People from Soriano Department
Rowers at the 1948 Summer Olympics
Rowers at the 1952 Summer Olympics
Olympic rowers of Uruguay
Olympic bronze medalists for Uruguay
Place of birth missing
Olympic medalists in rowing
Medalists at the 1952 Summer Olympics
Medalists at the 1948 Summer Olympics
Pan American Games medalists in rowing
Pan American Games silver medalists for Uruguay
Rowers at the 1955 Pan American Games
Medalists at the 1955 Pan American Games
20th-century Uruguayan people